A daïra or daerah ( circle; plural dawaïr) is an administrative division in Algeria and Western Sahara in West Africa, as well as Brunei, Indonesia and Malaysia in Southeast Asia. It is commonly translated in English as "district".

West Africa 

"Daïra" is the primary spelling variant used in Algeria and Western Sahara. It is a subdivision of wilayah in both countries.

Southeast Asia 
"Daerah" is an Arabic loanword in Malay and Indonesian, which is cognate with "daïra".

Brunei 

A daerah or district is the primary subdivision of Brunei. There are four , namely Belait, Brunei-Muara, Temburong and Tutong. A daerah is subdivided into mukims (equivalent to subdistricts) and subsequently villages.

Indonesia 

In Indonesia, "daerah" is used as in the term , which refers to the Special Regions or provinces with special status. There are five Special Regions, namely Aceh, Jakarta, Special Region of Yogyakarta, Papua and West Papua.

Malaysia 

A daerah or district is a type of state administrative divisions in Malaysia. It is the primary subdivision of the states in Peninsular Malaysia, where as in Sabah and Sarawak in Malaysian Borneo, it is the secondary subdivision which is below divisions. Regardless, any daerah may be subdivided into mukims.

See also 
 District
 Arrondissement

References 

Arabic words and phrases
Types of administrative division
Malay words and phrases